Alain Ramadier (born 8 July 1958) is a French politician of The Republicans who has been serving as a member of the National Assembly from 2017 to 2022, representing Seine-Saint-Denis's 10th constituency.

Political career 
In parliament, Ramadier served as member of the Committee on Social Affairs. In addition to his committee assignments, he was part of the French delegation to the Inter-Parliamentary Union (IPU).

He lost his seat in the 2022 French legislative election to Nadège Abomangoli from La France Insoumise.

References

External links 
 Biography at the National Assembly
 Twitter

Living people
1958 births
People from Seine-Saint-Denis
Politicians from Paris
Deputies of the 15th National Assembly of the French Fifth Republic
The Republicans (France) politicians
21st-century French politicians
Members of Parliament for Seine-Saint-Denis